Aubrey Scriven (7 July 1904 – 1988) was an English professional footballer who played as an outside left for Birmingham, Bradford City and Bristol City in the Football League. He also played non-league football for Warmsworth, Denaby United, Worcester City and Brierley Hill Alliance.

Life and career
Scriven was born in Highley, near Bridgnorth in Shropshire, to William Scriven, a roadman in a coal mine, and his wife Rose Ann. He played football for Highley Boys' Club before moving to Warmsworth, West Riding of Yorkshire, where he helped the village team win the Doncaster Amateur League title in 1922–23. According to the South Yorkshire Times of September 1923, "he is fast, has good ball control, centres accurately and shoots strongly from all angles. When he gains complete confidence in himself he should be one of the most dangerous wingers". He signed for Denaby United of the Midland League ahead of the 1923–24 season, and his performances attracted attention from clubs at a higher level. He was ever-present in senior competition for Denaby until, at the end of November, he joined Football League First Division club Birmingham for an undisclosed fee.

Scriven began his Birmingham career with the reserve team in the Central League. He made his Football League debut on 7 September 1924, replacing Ted Linley at outside left for the home match against Bolton Wanderers which Birmingham won 1–0. He kept his place for a couple of months before Linley took over, and then returned to the side for the last month of the season, during which he scored twice. Inconsistency meant he never established himself as a first-team regular. Over the next two seasons, he shared the position with players including Ernie Islip, Jack Russell and Billy Thirlaway, taking his appearance total to 60, of which all but one were made in league matches, with 9 goals.

Scriven signed for Bradford City in May 1927, as part of a £400 deal that also took Islip to the club. He made 105 appearances in the Football League, scoring 37 goals, as well as scoring once from 6 FA Cup matches, and left the club in May 1932 to join Bristol City.

He spent two seasons with Bristol City, during which he scored 17 goals from 67 appearances in all competitions, of which 54 appearances and 12 goals came in the Third Division South. He also scored in the final as Bristol City won the 1933–34 Welsh Cup, beating another English club, Tranmere Rovers, 3–0 in a replay after the original match was drawn. Scriven moved into non-league football with Worcester City in 1934. In his only season with the club, he scored 13 goals in the Birmingham & District League, and then joined Brierley Hill Alliance, where he remained until retiring from football during the war.

Scriven ran the Bell Inn, in Livery Street, Birmingham. His wife, Lily née Gunn, and their 10-year-old daughter Audrey Jean were killed when the city centre was bombed in October 1940 during the Birmingham Blitz. Scriven remarried in 1942, to Vera Thompson. After the war, he worked as a maintenance man at Monument Road Baths in Ladywood, Birmingham. His death at the age of 83 was registered in Birmingham in May 1988.

Honours
Bristol City
 Welsh Cup winner: 1933–34

Sources

References

1904 births
1988 deaths
People from Bridgnorth
Sportspeople from Shropshire
English footballers
Association football outside forwards
Denaby United F.C. players
Birmingham City F.C. players
Bradford City A.F.C. players
Bristol City F.C. players
Worcester City F.C. players
Brierley Hill Alliance F.C. players
Midland Football League players
English Football League players
Date of death missing